McAlisterville is an unincorporated community and census-designated place (CDP) in Fayette Township, Juniata County, Pennsylvania, United States. The population was 971 at the 2010 census.

Geography
McAlisterville is located in northeastern Juniata County at  (40.637602, -77.274102), in the center of Fayette Township. Pennsylvania Routes 35 and 235 pass through the center of town. PA 35 leads northeast  to Selinsgrove and southwest  to Mifflintown, the Juniata county seat, while PA 235 leads north over Shade Mountain  to Beaver Springs and south  to Thompsontown.

The community is in the valley of Little Lost Creek, a westward-flowing tributary of Lost Creek, which in turn is a tributary of the Juniata River.

Demographics

As of the census of 2000, there were 765 people, 337 households, and 209 families residing in the CDP. The population density was 818.2 people per square mile (314.2/km). There were 366 housing units at an average density of 391.4/sq mi (150.3/km). The racial makeup of the CDP was 99.08% White, 0.39% African American, 0.26% from other races, and 0.26% from two or more races. Hispanic or Latino of any race were 0.65% of the population.

There were 337 households, out of which 26.4% had children under the age of 18 living with them, 49.9% were married couples living together, 8.6% had a female householder with no husband present, and 37.7% were non-families. 34.1% of all households were made up of individuals, and 14.5% had someone living alone who was 65 years of age or older. The average household size was 2.27 and the average family size was 2.91.

In the CDP, the population was spread out, with 23.3% under the age of 18, 11.0% from 18 to 24, 26.8% from 25 to 44, 19.9% from 45 to 64, and 19.1% who were 65 years of age or older. The median age was 37 years. For every 100 females, there were 83.5 males. For every 100 females age 18 and over, there were 84.0 males.

The median income for a household in the CDP was $23,047, and the median income for a family was $32,411. Males had a median income of $25,893 versus $22,120 for females. The per capita income for the CDP was $16,821. About 13.7% of families and 12.8% of the population were below the poverty line, including 7.3% of those under age 18 and none of those age 65 or over.

Businesses and schools

McAlisterville is home to several businesses including the Bread of Life Restaurant, Lepley Trucking, R&F Trucking, Rickenbaugh Building Supply, Rosewood Market, Crownwood LLC., Sal's OIP, and (The) Creme Stop.

Schools within McAlisterville are East Juniata High School, Fayette Township Elementary, and Juniata Christian School.

Fire protection is provided by the Fayette Fire Company.  The fire company is all volunteer and greatly appreciates all who give their time or monetary gifts to continue service.

Ambulance service provided by Fayette Township EMS, Inc., which is entirely staffed by volunteers.

Notable people

McAlisterville is the boyhood home of radio personality Nelson Lauver of The American Storyteller Radio Journal.  Nelson is also the author of "Most Unlikely to Succeed."

Medal of Honor recipient and Civil War veteran Robert W. Ammerman died in, and is buried in, McAlisterville.

Educator George F. McFarland lived in McAlisterville and was superintendent of the McAlisterville Academy prior to the Civil War. McFarland organized local volunteers for Union military service in 1862. He served with distinction and commanded the 151st Pennsylvania Infantry at the Battle of Gettysburg.

Miriam [Smith] Wetzel, 1952 Miss Pennsylvania, is from McAlisterville.  Miriam went on to become an educator and author.

References

Census-designated places in Juniata County, Pennsylvania
Census-designated places in Pennsylvania